The Directors Guild of America Awards are issued annually by the Directors Guild of America. The first DGA Award was an "Honorary Life Member" award issued in 1938 to D. W. Griffith. The statues are made by New York firm, Society Awards.

Categories

Competitive categories

Special awards

Discontinued categories

Winners – Motion Picture

Lifetime Achievement Award

(formerly the D. W. Griffith Lifetime Achievement Award)

 1953: Cecil B. DeMille
 1954: John Ford
 1955: No award
 1956: Henry King
 1957: King Vidor
 1958: No award
 1959: Frank Capra
 1960: George Stevens
 1961: Frank Borzage
 1962–1965: No award
 1966: William Wyler
 1967: No award
 1968: Alfred Hitchcock
 1969: No award
 1970: Fred Zinnemann
 1971–1972: No award
 1973: William A. Wellman and David Lean
 1974–1980: No award
 1981: George Cukor
 1982: Rouben Mamoulian
 1983: John Huston
 1984: Orson Welles
 1985: Billy Wilder
 1986: Joseph L. Mankiewicz
 1987: Elia Kazan
 1988: Robert Wise
 1989: No award
 1990: Ingmar Bergman
 1991: No award
 1992: Akira Kurosawa
 1993: Sidney Lumet
 1994: Robert Altman
 1995: James Ivory
 1996: Woody Allen
 1997: Stanley Kubrick
 1998: Francis Ford Coppola
 1999: No award
 2000: Steven Spielberg
 2001: No award
 2002: Martin Scorsese
 2003: No award
 2004: Mike Nichols
 2005: No award
 2006: Clint Eastwood
 2007–2009: No award
 2010: Norman Jewison
 2011: Alice Guy-Blaché
 2012: Miloš Forman
 2013–2015: No award
 2016: Ridley Scott
 2017–2020: No award
 2021: Spike Lee

Outstanding Achievement in Feature Film

 1948: Joseph L. Mankiewicz – A Letter to Three Wives ¿
 1949: Robert Rossen – All the King's Men ¿ **
 1950: Joseph L. Mankiewicz – All About Eve † **
 1951: George Stevens – A Place in the Sun †
 1952: John Ford – The Quiet Man †
 1953: Fred Zinnemann – From Here to Eternity † **
 1954: Elia Kazan – On the Waterfront † **
 1955: Delbert Mann – Marty † **
 1956: George Stevens – Giant †
 1957: David Lean – The Bridge on the River Kwai † **
 1958: Vincente Minnelli – Gigi † **
 1959: William Wyler – Ben-Hur † **
 1960: Billy Wilder – The Apartment † **
 1961: Robert Wise – West Side Story † **
 1962: David Lean – Lawrence of Arabia † **
 1963: Tony Richardson – Tom Jones † **
 1964: George Cukor – My Fair Lady † **
 1965: Robert Wise – The Sound of Music † **
 1966: Fred Zinnemann – A Man for All Seasons † **
 1967: Mike Nichols – The Graduate †
 1968: Anthony Harvey – The Lion in Winter ‡
 1969: John Schlesinger – Midnight Cowboy † **
 1970: Franklin Schaffner – Patton † **
 1971: William Friedkin – The French Connection † **
 1972: Francis Ford Coppola – The Godfather ‡ **
 1973: George Roy Hill – The Sting † **
 1974: Francis Ford Coppola – The Godfather Part II † **
 1975: Miloš Forman – One Flew Over the Cuckoo's Nest † **
 1976: John G. Avildsen – Rocky † **
 1977: Woody Allen – Annie Hall † **
 1978: Michael Cimino – The Deer Hunter † **
 1979: Robert Benton – Kramer vs. Kramer † **
 1980: Robert Redford – Ordinary People † **
 1981: Warren Beatty – Reds †
 1982: Richard Attenborough – Gandhi † **
 1983: James L. Brooks – Terms of Endearment † **
 1984: Miloš Forman – Amadeus † **
 1985: Steven Spielberg – The Color Purple §
 1986: Oliver Stone – Platoon † **
 1987: Bernardo Bertolucci – The Last Emperor † **
 1988: Barry Levinson – Rain Man † **
 1989: Oliver Stone – Born on the Fourth of July †
 1990: Kevin Costner – Dances with Wolves † **
 1991: Jonathan Demme – The Silence of the Lambs † **
 1992: Clint Eastwood – Unforgiven † **
 1993: Steven Spielberg – Schindler's List † **
 1994: Robert Zemeckis – Forrest Gump † **
 1995: Ron Howard – Apollo 13 §
 1996: Anthony Minghella – The English Patient † **
 1997: James Cameron – Titanic † **
 1998: Steven Spielberg – Saving Private Ryan † 
 1999: Sam Mendes – American Beauty † **
 2000: Ang Lee – Crouching Tiger, Hidden Dragon ‡
 2001: Ron Howard – A Beautiful Mind † **
 2002: Rob Marshall – Chicago ‡ **
 2003: Peter Jackson – The Lord of the Rings: The Return of the King † **
 2004: Clint Eastwood – Million Dollar Baby † **
 2005: Ang Lee – Brokeback Mountain †
 2006: Martin Scorsese – The Departed † **
 2007: Joel and Ethan Coen – No Country for Old Men † **
 2008: Danny Boyle – Slumdog Millionaire † **
 2009: Kathryn Bigelow – The Hurt Locker † **
 2010: Tom Hooper – The King's Speech † **
 2011: Michel Hazanavicius – The Artist † **
 2012: Ben Affleck – Argo § **
 2013: Alfonso Cuarón – Gravity †
 2014: Alejandro G. Iñárritu – Birdman or (The Unexpected Virtue of Ignorance) † **
 2015: Alejandro G. Iñárritu – The Revenant †
 2016: Damien Chazelle – La La Land †
 2017: Guillermo del Toro – The Shape of Water † **
 2018: Alfonso Cuarón — Roma †
 2019: Sam Mendes — 1917 ‡
 2020: Chloe Zhao — Nomadland † **
 2021: Jane Campion — The Power of the Dog †
 2022: The Daniels — Everything Everywhere All at Once † **

 † – Director won the Academy Award.
 ‡ – Director did not win the Academy Award.
 § – Director was not nominated for Academy Award that year.
 ** - Film also won the Academy Award for Best Picture.
 ¿ – Originally, the DGA used a non-calendar year for its award. Both films competed in the 22nd Academy Awards for 1949, and both directors were nominated for Best Director; Mankiewicz won. All the King's Men won Best Picture; Rossen's DGA was not awarded until after the Oscars. (Beginning with the 1951 award in 1952, the DGA has been always awarded before the Oscars.)

Outstanding Achievement in Documentary

 1991: Barbara Kopple – American Dream
 1992: Joe Berlinger and Bruce Sinofsky – Brother's Keeper
 1993: Terry Zwigoff – Crumb
 1994: Steve James – Hoop Dreams
 1995: No award
 1996: Al Pacino – Looking for Richard
 1997: Michael Uys and Lexy Lovell – Riding the Rails
 1998: Jerry Blumenthal, Peter Gilbert, and Gordon Quinn – Vietnam, Long Time Coming
 1999: Nanette Burstein and Brett Morgen – On the Ropes
 2000: Chuck Braverman – High School Boot Camp
 2001: Chris Hegedus and Jehane Noujaim – Startup.com
 2002: Tasha Oldham – The Smith Family
 2003: Nathaniel Kahn – My Architect
 2004: Byambasuren Davaa and Luigi Falorni – The Story of the Weeping Camel
 2005: Werner Herzog – Grizzly Man
 2006: Arūnas Matelis – Before Flying Back to Earth
 2007: Asger Leth – Ghosts of Cité Soleil
 2008: Ari Folman – Waltz with Bashir
 2009: Louie Psihoyos – The Cove
 2010: Charles Ferguson – Inside Job
 2011: James Marsh – Project Nim
 2012: Malik Bendjelloul – Searching for Sugar Man
 2013: Jehane Noujaim – The Square
 2014: Laura Poitras – Citizenfour
 2015: Matthew Heineman – Cartel Land
 2016: Ezra Edelman – O.J.: Made in America
 2017: Matthew Heineman – City of Ghosts
 2018: Tim Wardle – Three Identical Strangers
 2019: Steven Bognar and Julia Reichert — American Factory
 2020: Michael Dweck & Gregory Kershaw — The Truffle Hunters
 2021: Stanley Nelson Jr. — Attica
 2022: Sara Dosa - Fire of Love

Outstanding Achievement in First-Time Feature Film

 2015: Alex Garland – Ex Machina
 2016: Garth Davis – Lion
 2017: Jordan Peele – Get Out
 2018: Bo Burnham – Eighth Grade
 2019: Alma Har'el — Honey Boy
 2020: Darius Marder — Sound of Metal
 2021: Maggie Gyllenhaal – The Lost Daughter
 2022: Charlotte Wells - Aftersun

Winners – Television

Lifetime Achievement Award
 2014: James Burrows and Robert Butler
 2015: Joe Pytka
 2018: Don Mischer
 2022: Robert A. Fishman

Outstanding Directorial Achievement in Commercials
 2012: Alejandro González Iñárritu (Procter & Gamble, "Best Job")

Outstanding Directorial Achievement in Comedy Series

 1990: James Burrows – Cheers ("Woody Interruptus")
 1991: Peter Bonerz – Murphy Brown ("Uh-Oh: Part 2")
 1992: Tom Cherones – Seinfeld ("The Contest")
 1993: James Burrows – Frasier ("The Good Son")
 1994: David Lee – Frasier ("The Matchmaker")
 1995: Gordon Hunt – Mad About You ("The Alan Brady Show")
 1996: Andy Ackerman – Seinfeld ("The Rye")
 1997: Andy Ackerman – Seinfeld ("The Betrayal")
 1998: Thomas Schlamme – Sports Night ("Pilot")
 1999: Thomas Schlamme – Sports Night ("Small Town")
 2000: James Burrows – Will & Grace ("Lows in the Mid-Eighties")
 2001: Todd Holland – Malcolm in the Middle ("Bowling")
 2002: Bryan Gordon – Curb Your Enthusiasm ("The Special Section")
 2003: Tim Van Patten – Sex and the City ("Boy, Interrupted")
 2004: Tim Van Patten – Sex and the City ("An American Girl in Paris: Part Deux")
 2005: Marc Buckland – My Name Is Earl ("Pilot")
 2006: Richard Shepard – Ugly Betty ("Pilot")
 2007: Barry Sonnenfeld – Pushing Daisies ("Pie-lette")
 2008: Paul Feig – The Office ("Dinner Party")
 2009: Jason Winer – Modern Family ("Pilot")
 2010: Michael Spiller – Modern Family ("Halloween")
 2011: Robert B. Weide – Curb Your Enthusiasm ("Palestinian Chicken")
 2012: Lena Dunham – Girls ("Pilot")
 2013: Beth McCarthy-Miller – 30 Rock ("Hogcock!" / "Last Lunch")
 2014: Jill Soloway – Transparent ("Best New Girl")
 2015: Chris Addison – Veep ("Election Night")
 2016: Becky Martin – Veep ("Inauguration")
 2017: Beth McCarthy-Miller – Veep ("Chicklet")
 2018: Bill Hader – Barry ("Chapter One: Make Your Mark")
 2019: Bill Hader – Barry ("ronny/lily")
 2020: Susanna Fogel – The Flight Attendant ("In Case of Emergency")
 2021: Lucia Aniello – Hacks ("There Is No Line")

Outstanding Directorial Achievement in Dramatic Series

 1971: Daniel Petrie – The Man and the City ("Hands of Love")
 1972: Robert Butler – The Waltons ("Dust Bowl Cousins")
 1973: Charles S. Dubin – Kojak ("Knockover")
 1974: David Friedkin – Kojak ("Cross Your Heart, Hope to Die")
 1975: James Cellan Jones – Jennie: Lady Randolph Churchill
 1976: Glenn Jordan – Family ("Rites of Friendship")
 1977: John Erman – Roots ("Part II")
 1978: Gene Reynolds – Lou Grant ("Prisoner")
 1979: Roger Young – Lou Grant ("Cop")
 1980: Roger Young – Lou Grant ("Lou")
 1981: Robert Butler – Hill Street Blues ("Hill Street Station")
 1982: David Anspaugh – Hill Street Blues ("Personal Foul")
 1983: Jeff Bleckner – Hill Street Blues ("Life in the Minors")
 1984: Thomas Carter – Hill Street Blues ("The Rise and Fall of Paul the Wall")
 1985: Will Mackenzie – Moonlighting ("My Fair David")
 1986: Will Mackenzie – Moonlighting ("Atomic Shakespeare")
 1987: Marshall Herskovitz – thirtysomething ("Pilot")
 1988: Marshall Herskovitz – thirtysomething ("Therapy")
 1989: Eric Laneuville – L.A. Law ("I'm in the Nude for Love")
 1990: Michael Zinberg – Quantum Leap ("The Leap Home" – Part II)
 1991: Eric Laneuville – I'll Fly Away ("All God's Children")
 1992: Rob Thompson – Northern Exposure ("Cicely")
 1993: Gregory Hoblit – NYPD Blue ("Pilot")
 1994: Charles Haid – ER ("Into That Good Night")
 1995: Christopher Chulack – ER ("Hell and High Water")
 1996: Christopher Chulack – ER ("Fear of Flying")
 1997: Barbara Kopple – Homicide: Life on the Street ("The Documentary")
 1998: Paris Barclay – NYPD Blue ("Hearts and Souls")
 1999: David Chase – The Sopranos ("The Sopranos")
 2000: Thomas Schlamme – The West Wing ("Noël")
 2001: Alan Ball – Six Feet Under ("Pilot")
 2002: John Patterson – The Sopranos ("Whitecaps")
 2003: Christopher Misiano – The West Wing ("Twenty Five")
 2004: Walter Hill – Deadwood ("Deadwood")
 2005: Michael Apted – Rome ("The Stolen Eagle")
 2006: Jon Cassar – 24 ("Day 5: 7:00 a.m. – 8:00 a.m.")
 2007: Alan Taylor – Mad Men ("Smoke Gets in Your Eyes")
 2008: Dan Attias – The Wire ("Transitions")
 2009: Lesli Linka Glatter – Mad Men ("Guy Walks Into an Advertising Agency")
 2010: Martin Scorsese – Boardwalk Empire ("Boardwalk Empire")
 2011: Patty Jenkins – The Killing ("Pilot")
 2012: Rian Johnson – Breaking Bad ("Fifty-One")
 2013: Vince Gilligan – Breaking Bad ("Felina")
 2014: Lesli Linka Glatter – Homeland ("From A to B and Back Again")
 2015: David Nutter – Game of Thrones ("Mother's Mercy")
 2016: Miguel Sapochnik – Game of Thrones ("Battle of the Bastards")
 2017: Reed Morano – The Handmaid's Tale ("Offred")
 2018: Adam McKay – Succession ("Celebration")
 2019: Nicole Kassell – Watchmen ("It's Summer and We're Running Out of Ice")
 2020: Lesli Linka Glatter – Homeland ("Prisoners of War")
 2021: Mark Mylod – Succession ("All the Bells Say")

Outstanding Directorial Achievement in Children's Programs

 1984: Sharron Miller – The Woman Who Willed a Miracle
 1996: Stuart Margolin – Salt Water Moose
 1997: Brian Robbins – Nickelodeon Sports Theater ("First Time")
 1998: Mitchell Kriegman – Bear in the Big Blue House ("Love Is All You Need")
 1999: Amy Schatz – Goodnight Moon and Other Sleepy Time Tales
 2000: Greg Beeman – Miracle in Lane 2
 2001: Amy Schatz –  'Twas the Night: A Holiday Celebration
 2002: Guy Ferland – Bang Bang You're Dead
 2003: Kevin Lima – Eloise at Christmastime
 2004: Stuart Gillard – Going to the Mat
 2005: Chris Eyre – Edge of America
 2006: Kenny Ortega – High School Musical
 2007: Paul Hoen – Jump In!
 2008: Amy Schatz – Classical Baby ("The Poetry Show")
 2009: Allison Liddi-Brown – Princess Protection Program
 2010: Eric Bross – The Boy Who Cried Werewolf
 2011: Amy Schatz – A Child's Garden of Poetry
 2012: Paul Hoen – Let It Shine
 2013: Amy Schatz – An Apology to Elephants
 2014: Jonathan Judge – 100 Things To Do Before High School ("Pilot")
 2015: Kenny Ortega – Descendants
 2016: Tina Mabry – An American Girl Story – Melody 1963: Love Has to Win
 2017: Niki Caro – Anne with an E ("Your Will Shall Decide Your Destiny")

Outstanding Directorial Achievement in Daytime Serials (1991–2012)

 1991: Michael Stich – The Bold and the Beautiful ("Episode #1103")
 1992: Susan Strickler – Another World ("Episode 7022")
 1993: Jill Mitwell – One Life to Live ("Episode 6356")
 1994: Michael Stich – The Bold and the Beautiful ("Episode 1884")
 1995: William Ludel and Alan Pultz – General Hospital ("Episode 8248")
 1996: Kathyrn Foster and Mike Denney – The Young and the Restless ("Episode 5875")
 1997: Scott McKinsey – General Hospital ("Episode #8883")
 1998: James Sayegh – One Life to Live ("Episode #7572")
 1999: Herb D. Stein and Roger W. Inman – Days of Our Lives ("Episode #8557")
 2000: Jill Mitwell – One Life to Live ("Episode #8205")
 2001: William Ludel – General Hospital ("Episode #9801")
 2002: Scott McKinsey – Port Charles ("Episode #1433")
 2003: Larry Carpenter – One Life to Live ("Episode #8849")
 2004: Bruce S. Barry – Guiding Light ("Episode #14,321")
 2005: Owen Renfroe – General Hospital ("Episode #10914")
 2006: Jill Mitwell – One Life to Live ("Episode #9779")
 2007: Larry Carpenter – One Life to Live ("Episode #9947")
 2008: Larry Carpenter – One Life to Live ("Episode #10281")
 2009: Christopher Goutman – As the World Turns ("Once Upon a Time")
 2010: Larry Carpenter – One Life to Live ("Starr X'd Lovers: The Musical – Part II")
 2011: William Ludel – General Hospital ("Intervention")
 2012: Jill Mitwell – One Life to Live ("Between Heaven and Hell")

Outstanding Directorial Achievement in Reality Programs (2005–present)

 2005: Tony Croll – Three Wishes ("Pilot") & J. Rupert Thompson – Fear Factor ("Heist Fear Factor") (TIE)
 2006: Tony Sacco – Treasure Hunters ("Episode #101")
 2007: Bertram van Munster – The Amazing Race ("Episode #1110")
 2008: Tony Croll – America's Next Top Model ("Episode 1002")
 2009: Craig Borders – Extreme Engineering ("Hong Kong Bridge")
 2010: Eytan Keller – The Next Iron Chef ("Episode #301")
 2011: Neil P. DeGroot – The Biggest Loser ("Episode #1115")
 2012: Brian Smith – MasterChef ("Episode #305")
 2013: Neil P. DeGroot – 72 Hours ("The Lost Coast")
 2014: Anthony B. Sacco – The Chair ("The Test")
 2015: Adam Vetri – Steve Austin's Broken Skull Challenge ("Gods of War")
 2016: J. Rupert Thompson – American Grit ("Over the Falls")
 2017: Brian Smith – MasterChef ("Vegas Deluxe & Oyster Schucks")

Outstanding Directorial Achievement in Movies for Television and Miniseries

 2000: Jeff Bleckner – The Beach Boys: An American Family
 2001: Frank Pierson – Conspiracy
 2002: Mick Jackson – Live from Baghdad
 2003: Mike Nichols – Angels in America
 2004: Joseph Sargent – Something the Lord Made
 2005: George C. Wolfe – Lackawanna Blues
 2006: Walter Hill – Broken Trail
 2007: Yves Simoneau – Bury My Heart at Wounded Knee
 2008: Jay Roach – Recount
 2009: Ross Katz – Taking Chance
 2010: Mick Jackson – Temple Grandin
 2011: Jon Cassar – The Kennedys
 2012: Jay Roach – Game Change
 2013: Steven Soderbergh – Behind the Candelabra
 2014: Lisa Cholodenko – Olive Kitteridge
 2015: Dee Rees – Bessie
 2016: Steve Zaillian – The Night Of ("The Beach")
 2017: Jean-Marc Vallée – Big Little Lies
 2018: Ben Stiller – Escape at Dannemora
 2019: Johan Renck – Chernobyl

Outstanding Directorial Achievement in a Variety/Talk/News/Sports Series (2013–present)
Note: This award is for regular programming.
 2013: Don Roy King – Saturday Night Live ("Justin Timberlake")
 2014: Dave Diomedi – The Tonight Show Starring Jimmy Fallon ("Episode #1")
 2015: Dave Diomedi – The Tonight Show Starring Jimmy Fallon ("Episode #325")
 2016: Don Roy King – Saturday Night Live ("Dave Chappelle")
 2017: Don Roy King – Saturday Night Live ("Jimmy Fallon")

Outstanding Directorial Achievement in a Variety/Talk/News/Sports Special (2013–present)
Note: This award is for special programs.
 2013: Glenn Weiss – 67th Tony Awards
 2014: Glenn Weiss – 68th Tony Awards
 2015: Don Roy King – Saturday Night Live 40th Anniversary Special
 2016: Glenn Weiss – 70th Tony Awards
 2017: Glenn Weiss – 89th Academy Awards

See also
Directors Finder Series

References

External links 
 

American film awards
American television awards
 
Lists of films by award